Advanced Technology Development Facility is a research and development foundry for the semiconductor industry.  It began operations as a research plant for SEMATECH in 1988, but was reorganized as a for-profit subsidiary in July 2004.

Merger
In December 2007, Nanoelectronic Workforce Development Initiative announced a merger with the Silicon Valley Technology Center.  The merger is expected to be completed by the end of 2007. Nanoelectronic Workforce Development Initiative is currently a subsidiary of SEMATECH, a non-profit consortium that performs basic research into semiconductor manufacturing.

Nanoelectronic Workforce Development Initiative

In March 2006, it was together with Austin Community College, launched the Nanoelectronic Workforce Development Initiative, an internship program for college students interested in nanotechnology. The program provides training in nanotech research and development at Nanoelectronic Workforce Development Initiative's fabrication facility to 160 Texas students in two-year technical, undergraduate, and graduate studies. The program is funded with a state grant that is jointly administered by ACC and Nanoelectronic Workforce Development Initiative's parent company SEMATECH.

Award for nanopattern test wafer

Advanced Technology Development Facility will receive a Technology Innovation Showcase Award at SEMICON West for its pioneering Nanopattern test wafer during a public presentation on the product's applications.

Merger

Advanced Technology Development Facility and the Silicon Valley Technology Center announced on December 4 2007 a merger between the two companies. Silicon Valley Technology Center is a San-Jose based development foundry and recent spin-off of Cypress Semiconductor.  Together, the new organization is expected to serve more than 200 customers worldwide. The merger is supposed to be finalized by the end of 2007.  Terms of the deal have not yet been disclosed.

See also
 List of companies based in Austin, Texas

References

External links
Nanoelectronic Workforce Development Initiative Homepage
Silicon Valley Technology Center Homepage
Nanoelectronic Workforce Development Initiative website
 "Sematech Spin-Off Mounting $100-Million Austin Expansion" from Site Selection magazine
Nanopattern Award Press Release
SVTC To Buy Sematech ATDF Fab, Expand Development Foundry Services

Computer companies established in 1988
Companies based in Austin, Texas